Prateek Kataria (born 16 October 1995) is an Indian cricketer. He made his first-class debut for Arunachal Pradesh in the 2018–19 Ranji Trophy on 6 December 2018. He made his Twenty20 debut for Arunachal Pradesh in the 2018–19 Syed Mushtaq Ali Trophy on 21 February 2019.

References

External links
 

1995 births
Living people
Indian cricketers
Place of birth missing (living people)
Arunachal Pradesh cricketers